The large-cell lymphomas have large cells. One classification system for lymphomas divides the diseases according to the size of the white blood cells that have turned cancerous. A large cell, in this context, has a diameter of 17 to 20 μm.  Other groups of lymphomas in this system are the small-cell lymphomas and mixed-cell lymphomas.

Types

B cell
Diffuse large B-cell lymphoma is the most common of the large-cell lymphomas. MeSH now classifies the phrase "large-cell lymphoma" under "Diffuse large B cell lymphoma".

Many other B-cell lymphomas feature large cells:
 Angiocentric lymphoma
 Burkitt's lymphoma
 Follicular large-cell lymphoma
 Immunoblastic lymphoma
 Intravascular large-cell lymphoma
 Primary mediastinal B-cell lymphoma
 T-cell–rich B-cell lymphoma
 Primary splenic lymphoma (rare)
 Primary central nervous system lymphomas, which are often diffuse large-B-cell lymphomas
 Richter's transformation: Diffuse Large B-cell Variant
1) ABC subtype (common)
2) GCB subtype (rare)

Activated B-Cell Diffuse Large B-Cell Lymphoma, or ABC-DLBCL, is believed to be caused by aberrant activation of a critical intracellular pathway.
This intracellular signaling pathway involved in B-cell activation and proliferation stays constantly activated, driving lymphocytes to proliferate continuously.
The inhibition of this pathway can be induced by a drug known as NEMO Binding Domain, or NBD, a peptide causing increased cell death of malignant lymphocytes.

T cell
Less commonly, a large-cell lymphoma may feature T cells.  Anaplastic large-cell lymphoma is an example of a large-cell lymphoma that involves T cells.  Of the large-cell T-cell lymphomas, it has the best prognosis.

References

External links 

Non-Hodgkin lymphoma